Bear, Oveys and Great Bottom Woods is a  biological Site of Special Scientific Interest west of Henley-on-Thames in Oxfordshire.

This beech woodland has more than 40 species of ground flora which is commonly associated with ancient woods in southern Britain, including broad-leaved helleborine, southern wood-rush, yellow archangel, enchanter's nightshade, goldilocks buttercup, woodruff and the moss Leucobryum glaucum.

References

 
Sites of Special Scientific Interest in Oxfordshire